The Argentine Marxist–Leninist Communist Party (abbreviated PCMLA) was a communist party in Argentina. PCMLA was founded in 1975 as splinter group of the Marxist–Leninist Communist Party. It had a pro-China orientation. Leaders of PCMLA included Oscar Ríos (general secretary), José Ríos (organizational secretary), Daniel Egea, Carlos Herrera, and Ramón Ruiz. The party was active in the student movement. Its student wing was Grupos de Resistencia Estudiantil (GRE, 'Student Resistance Groups'). It had cells in Buenos Aires city and province, Corrientes, Entre Ríos and Santa Fe. The party had a front organization in the meat industry, Resistencia Obrera de la Carne (ROC, Meat Workers Resistance).

The military junta designated PCMLA as a 'band of terrorist criminals'. On May 30, 1976 PCMLA guerrillas captured colonel Juan Alberto Pita, the person the military junta had put in charge of the Confederación General del Trabajo (CGT), in the La Plata city of Manuel B. Gonnet (generally referred to as "Gonnet").

In 1978 the party suffered state repression and began to disintegrate. In 1982 PCMLA merged with PCML, forming the Liberation Party.

References

Communist parties in Argentina
Political parties established in 1975